Goddess of the West may refer to:

 Hathor, the "Mistress of the West", in Egyptian mythology
 Imentet, the "Goddess of the West" in Egyptian mythology, who may have simply been an attribute of Hathor or Isis
 Xi Wangmu, the "Queen Mother of the West", in Chinese mythology